Ramdevra is a village situated about 12 km to the north of Pokhran in Jaisalmer district of Rajasthan in India. Ramdevra was established by Baba Ramdev Pir, who was son of ruler of Pokhran Ajmal Singh Tanwar. Gram Panchayat of Ramdevra is one of the most economically productive Gram panchayat in Rajasthan, as tourist and devotees inflow in village is huge. A fair is held in Ramdevra between August–September, which attracts devotees from other states like Punjab, Haryana, Gujarat, MP and from all over India. Some of the famous tourist attractions of village are Ramdev Pir temple, Ramsarovar lake (a lake believed to be carved by Ramdev Pir Himself), Parcha Bawdi stepwell, Jhoola-Paalna etc.

Origin of name 
The village is named after Baba Ramdevji, a Tanwar Rajput and a saint who took Samādhi in 1384 CE, at the age of 33 years. Ramdevji Maharaj took samadhi (conscious exit from the mortal body) in 1459 AD. Maharaja Ganga Singh of Bikaner constructed a temple around the samadhi in 1931 AD.

Geography 
Near the village, there is a tank known as Ramsagar Talab which is believed to have been constructed by Baba Ramdevji himself. A large step well, the Parcha Bavori is also situated nearby.

Fair 
A large fair known as Ramdevera Fair is held here from Bhado Sudi 2 to Bhado Sudi 10 (Aug - Sept).  It is attended by a large number of devotees who come in large groups from far and wide. Irrespective of their caste, creed or religious affiliations, these devotees throng the shrine dedicated to the saint. These groups organize night long singing of bhajans and kirtans to pay homage to Baba.The birthplace of Baba is situated nearly 150 km from Ramdevra between Ramderiya Undu and Kashmir of Barmer district.

Rulers 
Rulers of Ramdevra ( Runija - Pokhran )
Anagpal Tomar II
Amji (Pokran - Jaisalmer)
Salivaahan (Torawati - Patan)
Tejpal (Dilli)
Rana Amji
Rana Akheraj
Rana Bheevraj
Rana Jograj
Rana Ransi
Rana Ajmalji
Rao Veeramdev (Veer devra)
Rao Ramdev (Baba Ramdevji of Ramdevra)
Rajsi
Biko
Lakha (Lakshmanji)
Rao Ramdevji
Rao Devraj
Sadoji
Giriraj ji
Mehraj ji
Bheev ji
Jaito ji
Rao Devraj
Rao Ratan
Rao Govind
Rao Devkarn
Rao Prithviraj
Rao Mal Singh
Rao Bhopal Singh
Rao Raghunathji
Rao Mal Singh
Rao Ajay Singh
Rao Kishore Singh
Rao Sawai Singh
Rao Chainn Singh
Rao Balidaan Singh
Rao Hemant Singh
Rao Gaj Singh
Rao Rinmal Singh
Rao Jaswant Singh
Rao Bhom Singhji

See also
 Ramapir Temple Tando Allahyar

References 

 Ramdevra
 Ramapir.org
 

Temples in Rajasthan
Villages in Jaisalmer district